Janusz Teofil Tomaszewski (born 13 September 1956 in Pabianice) is a Polish politician. A Solidarity activist, member of Solidarity Electoral Action. He was a vice-prime minister and Minister of Internal Affairs from 31 October 1997 to 3 September 1999. He was forced to resign his official position due to lustration controversy (he was cleared of all suspicions in 2001). In 2004 he joined the Party Centrum.

References

1956 births
Living people
Deputy Prime Ministers of Poland
Interior ministers of Poland
Solidarity Electoral Action politicians
Solidarity (Polish trade union) activists
People from Pabianice